Quackenbush is a surname.

Name
Notable people with the surname include:
Alvin J. Quackenbush, American merchant and politician from New York
Bill Quackenbush, Canadian professional hockey player
Chuck Quackenbush, American politician from California; state insurance commissioner and state assemblyman
Dave Quackenbush, American punk rock singer
Henry Quackenbush, American industrialist
John A. Quackenbush, American politician from New York; U.S. representative 1888–1893
John Quackenbush, American computational biologist and genome scientist
Justin Lowe Quackenbush, American jurist
Kevin Quackenbush, American baseball player
Max Quackenbush, Canadian professional hockey player
Mike Quackenbush, American professional wrestler
Robert Quackenbush, American children's author
Robert Quackenbush (politician), American politician from Wisconsin
Sandra Quackenbush, American virologist
Professor Quackenbush, a fictional adult character by Sloan Fischer in Kidsongs: Very Silly Songs

Products
Quackenbush rifle

See also
Herman I. Quackenboss, New York politician